Lehr Sultanpur is a village and union council, an administrative subdivision, of Chakwal District in the Punjab Province of Pakistan. It is part of Choa Saidan Shah Tehsil. The village is actually composed of four smaller villages: Khoti, Dhoak Jalap/Warra, Lehr and Sultanpur. The population belongs to Mirza/Mughal and Rajput Jalap tribes.

History
The year 1810 proved worst for Janjua Rajputs as in the first month of this year the founder of Sikh Empire in Punjab, Mahraja Ranjit Singh, besieged the fort. The then king of Kusak State Sultan Fateh Mohammad Khan gave a tough time to Ranjit Singh.

The Sultan kept on fighting for six months and kept Ranjit Singh at bay. Finding no other option, Ranjit Singh had to strike a truce with Sultan Mohammad. However, the long siege of six months cast heavily on the lives of the inhabitants of Kusak Fort as they ran short of drinking water and food. Having left with no other option, the Sultan along with all other members of his tribe relocated to Haranpur and stayed there for 40 years. The Sultan died in Haranpur in 1830 and his family returned to their motherland in 1850 where they laid the foundation of Lehr Sultanpur village which is adjacent to Kusak village. The lost Kusak State remained in the possession of Sultan Fateh Mohammad Khan's siblings and is still owned by his successors (added by Shahzad Raja Wara Jalap).

References

Populated places in Chakwal District
Union councils of Chakwal District